Criticism of capitalism ranges from expressing disagreement with the principles of capitalism in its entirety to expressing disagreement with particular outcomes of capitalism.

Criticism of capitalism comes from various political and philosophical approaches, including anarchist, socialist, Marxist, religious, and nationalist viewpoints. Some believe that capitalism can only be overcome through revolution while others believe that structural change can come slowly through political reforms. Some critics believe there are merits in capitalism and wish to balance it with some form of social control, typically through government regulation (e.g. the social market movement).

Prominent among critiques of capitalism are accusations that capitalism is inherently exploitative, alienating, unstable, unsustainable, and creates massive economic inequality, commodifies people, and is anti-democratic and leads to an erosion of human rights and national sovereignty while it incentivises imperialist expansion and war.

History 

Early critics of capitalism, such as Frederick Engels, claim that rapid industrialization in Europe created working conditions viewed as unfair, including 14-hour work days, child labor and shanty towns. Some modern economists argue that average living standards did not improve, or only very slowly improved, before 1840.

Early socialist thinkers rejected capitalism altogether, attempting to create socialist communities free of the perceived injustices of early capitalism. Among these utopian socialists were Charles Fourier and Robert Owen. In 1848, Karl Marx and Friedrich Engels released The Communist Manifesto, which outlined a political and economic critique of capitalism based on the philosophy of historical materialism. Pierre-Joseph Proudhon, a contemporary of Marx, was another notable critic of capitalism and was one of the first to call himself an anarchist.

By the early 20th century, myriad socialist tendencies (e.g. anarcho-syndicalism, social democracy and Bolshevism) had arisen based on different interpretations of current events. Governments also began placing restrictions on market operations and created interventionist programs, attempting to ameliorate perceived market shortcomings (e.g. Keynesian economics and the New Deal). Starting with the 1917 Russian Revolution, Communist states increased in number and a Cold War started with the developed capitalist nations. Following the Revolutions of 1989, many of these Communist states adopted market economies.

Criticism by different schools of thought

Anarchism 

French anarchist Pierre-Joseph Proudhon opposed government privilege that protects capitalist, banking and land interests and the accumulation or acquisition of property (and any form of coercion that led to it) which he believed hampers competition and keeps wealth in the hands of the few. The Spanish individualist anarchist Miguel Giménez Igualada sees "capitalism is an effect of government; the disappearance of government means capitalism falls from its pedestal vertiginously ... That which we call capitalism is not something else but a product of the State, within which the only thing that is being pushed forward is profit, good or badly acquired. And so to fight against capitalism is a pointless task, since be it State capitalism or Enterprise capitalism, as long as Government exists, exploiting capital will exist. The fight, but of consciousness, is against the State".

Within anarchism, there emerged a critique of wage slavery which refers to a situation perceived as quasi-voluntary slavery, where a person's livelihood depends on wages, especially when the dependence is total and immediate. It is a negatively connoted term used to draw an analogy between slavery and wage labor by focusing on similarities between owning and renting a person. The term "wage slavery" has been used to criticize economic exploitation and social stratification, with the former seen primarily as unequal bargaining power between labor and capital (particularly when workers are paid comparatively low wages, e.g. in sweatshops) and the latter as a lack of workers' self-management, fulfilling job choices and leisure in an economy.

Libertarian socialists believe if freedom is valued, then society must work towards a system in which individuals have the power to decide economic issues along with political issues. Libertarian socialists seek to replace unjustified authority with direct democracy, voluntary federation and popular autonomy in all aspects of life, including physical communities and economic enterprises. With the advent of the Industrial Revolution, thinkers such as Proudhon and Marx elaborated the comparison between wage labor and slavery in the context of a critique of societal property not intended for active personal use, Luddites emphasized the dehumanization brought about by machines while later Emma Goldman famously denounced wage slavery by saying: "The only difference is that you are hired slaves instead of block slaves". American anarchist Emma Goldman believed that the economic system of capitalism was incompatible with human liberty. "The only demand that property recognizes", she wrote in Anarchism and Other Essays, "is its own gluttonous appetite for greater wealth, because wealth means power; the power to subdue, to crush, to exploit, the power to enslave, to outrage, to degrade". She also argued that capitalism dehumanized workers, "turning the producer into a mere particle of a machine, with less will and decision than his master of steel and iron".

Noam Chomsky contends that there is little moral difference between chattel slavery and renting one's self to an owner or "wage slavery". He feels that it is an attack on personal integrity that undermines individual freedom. He holds that workers should own and control their workplace. Many libertarian socialists argue that large-scale voluntary associations should manage industrial manufacture while workers retain rights to the individual products of their labor. As such, they see a distinction between the concepts of "private property" and "personal possession". Whereas "private property" grants an individual exclusive control over a thing whether it is in use or not and regardless of its productive capacity, "possession" grants no rights to things that are not in use.

In addition to anarchist Benjamin Tucker's "big four" monopolies (land, money, tariffs and patents) that have emerged under capitalism, neo-mutualist economist Kevin Carson argues that the state has also transferred wealth to the wealthy by subsidizing organizational centralization in the form of transportation and communication subsidies. He believes that Tucker overlooked this issue due to Tucker's focus on individual market transactions, whereas Carson also focuses on organizational issues. The theoretical sections of Studies in Mutualist Political Economy are presented as an attempt to integrate marginalist critiques into the labor theory of value. Carson has also been highly critical of intellectual property. The primary focus of his most recent work has been decentralized manufacturing and the informal and household economies. Carson holds that "[c]apitalism, arising as a new class society directly from the old class society of the Middle Ages, was founded on an act of robbery as massive as the earlier feudal conquest of the land. It has been sustained to the present by continual state intervention to protect its system of privilege without which its survival is unimaginable".

Carson coined the pejorative term "vulgar libertarianism", a phrase that describes the use of a free market rhetoric in defense of corporate capitalism and economic inequality. According to Carson, the term is derived from the phrase "vulgar political economy", which Karl Marx described as an economic order that "deliberately becomes increasingly apologetic and makes strenuous attempts to talk out of existence the ideas which contain the contradictions [existing in economic life]". Capitalism has been criticized for establishing power in the hands of a minority capitalist class that exists through the exploitation of a working class majority; for prioritizing profit over social good, natural resources and the environment; and for being an engine of inequality and economic instabilities.

Conservatism and traditionalism 

Edmund Burke accepted the liberal ideals of private property and the economics of Adam Smith, but he thought that economics should remain subordinate to the conservative social ethic, that capitalism should be subordinate to the medieval social tradition and that the business class should be subordinate to aristocracy.

Distributism is an economic ideology asserting that the world's productive assets should be widely owned rather than concentrated. It was developed in Europe in the late 19th and early 20th centuries based upon the principles of Catholic social teaching, especially the teachings of Pope Leo XIII in his encyclical Rerum novarum (1891) and Pope Pius XI in Quadragesimo anno (1931). It views both capitalism and socialism as equally flawed and exploitative, and it favors economic mechanisms such as small-scale cooperatives and family businesses, and large-scale antitrust regulations.

In Conservatives Against Capitalism, Peter Kolozi relies on Norberto Bobbio's definition of right and left, dividing the two camps according to their preference for equality or hierarchy. Kolozi argued that capitalism has faced persistent criticism from the right since the beginning of the Industrial Revolution. Such critics, while heterogeneous, are united in the belief “that laissez-faire capitalism has undermined an established social hierarchy governed by the virtuous or excellent".

In September 2018, Murtaza Hussain wrote in The Intercept about "Conservatives Against Capitalism", stating:
For all their differences, there is one key aspect of the intellectual history charted in "Conservatives Against Capitalism" that deals with an issue of shared concern on both the left and the right: the need for community. One of the grim consequences of the Social Darwinian pressures unleashed by free-market capitalism has been the destruction of networks of community, family, and professional associations in developed societies. ... These so-called intermediate institutions have historically played a vital role giving ordinary people a sense of meaning and protecting them from the structural violence of the state and the market. Their loss has led to the creation of a huge class of atomized and lonely people, cut adrift from traditional sources of support and left alone to contend with the power of impersonal economic forces.

Fascism 

Fascists opposed both international socialism and free-market capitalism, arguing that their views represented a Third Position and claiming to provide a realistic economic alternative that was neither laissez-faire capitalism nor communism. They favored corporatism and class collaboration, believing that the existence of inequality and social hierarchy was beneficial (contrary to the views of socialists) while also arguing that the state had a role in mediating relations between classes (contrary to the views of economic liberals).

Liberalism 

During the Age of Enlightenment, some proponents of liberalism were critics of wage slavery. On the other hand, some modern-day liberals are critical only of laissez-faire capitalism and support a social market economy while others are critical of the mixed economy welfare state and advocate either its abolition in favor of laissez-faire capitalism or a reduction of its role in favor of free-market capitalism.

Marxism 

Marx considered capitalism to be a historically specific mode of production (the way in which the productive property is owned and controlled, combined with the corresponding social relations between individuals based on their connection with the process of production).

The "capitalistic era" according to Karl Marx dates from 16th-century merchants and small urban workshops. Marx knew that wage labour existed on a modest scale for centuries before capitalist industry. For Marx, the capitalist stage of development or "bourgeois society" represented the most advanced form of social organization to date, but he also thought that the working classes would come to power in a worldwide socialist or communist transformation of human society as the end of the series of first aristocratic, then capitalist and finally working class rule was reached.

Following Adam Smith, Marx distinguished the use value of commodities from their exchange value in the market. According to Marx, capital is created with the purchase of commodities for the purpose of creating new commodities with an exchange value higher than the sum of the original purchases. For Marx, the use of labor power had itself become a commodity under capitalism and the exchange value of labor power, as reflected in the wage, is less than the value it produces for the capitalist.

This difference in values, he argues, constitutes surplus value, which the capitalists extract and accumulate. In his book Capital, Marx argues that the capitalist mode of production is distinguished by how the owners of capital extract this surplus from workers—all prior class societies had extracted surplus labor, but capitalism was new in doing so via the sale-value of produced commodities. He argues that a core requirement of a capitalist society is that a large portion of the population must not possess sources of self-sustenance that would allow them to be independent and are instead forced to sell their labor for a wage.

In conjunction with his criticism of capitalism was Marx's belief that the working class, due to its relationship to the means of production and numerical superiority under capitalism, would be the driving force behind the socialist revolution. This argument is intertwined with Marx' version of the labor theory of value arguing that labor is the source of all value and thus of profit.

In Imperialism, the Highest Stage of Capitalism (1916), Vladimir Lenin further developed Marxist theory and argued that capitalism necessarily led to monopoly capitalism and the export of capital—which he also called "imperialism"—to find new markets and resources, representing the last and highest stage of capitalism. Some 20th-century Marxian economists consider capitalism to be a social formation where capitalist class processes dominate, but are not exclusive.

To these thinkers, capitalist class processes are simply those in which surplus labor takes the form of surplus value, usable as capital; other tendencies for utilization of labor nonetheless exist simultaneously in existing societies where capitalist processes predominate. However, other late Marxian thinkers argue that a social formation as a whole may be classed as capitalist if capitalism is the mode by which a surplus is extracted, even if this surplus is not produced by capitalist activity as when an absolute majority of the population is engaged in non-capitalist economic activity.

In Limits to Capital (1982), David Harvey outlines an overdetermined, "spatially restless" capitalism coupled with the spatiality of crisis formation and resolution. Harvey used Marx's theory of crisis to aid his argument that capitalism must have its "fixes", but that we cannot predetermine what fixes will be implemented, nor in what form they will be. His work on contractions of capital accumulation and international movements of capitalist modes of production and money flows has been influential. According to Harvey, capitalism creates the conditions for volatile and geographically uneven development.

Sociologists such as Ulrich Beck envisioned the society of risk as a new cultural value which saw risk as a commodity to be exchanged in globalized economies. This theory suggested that disasters and capitalist economy were inevitably entwined. Disasters allow the introduction of economic programs which otherwise would be rejected as well as decentralizing the class structure in production.

Religion 

Many organized religions have criticized or opposed specific elements of capitalism. Traditional Judaism, Christianity, and Islam forbid lending money at interest, although alternative methods of banking have been developed. Some Christians have criticized capitalism for its materialist aspects and its inability to account for the wellbeing of all people. Many of Jesus' parables deal with economic concerns: farming, shepherding, being in debt, doing hard labor, being excluded from banquets and the houses of the rich and have implications for wealth and power distribution. Catholic scholars and clergy have often criticized capitalism because of its disenfranchisement of the poor, often promoting distributism as an alternative. In his 84-page apostolic exhortation , Catholic Pope Francis described unfettered capitalism as "a new tyranny" and called on world leaders to fight rising poverty and inequality, stating:

The Catholic Church forbids usury. As established by papal encyclicals Rerum Novarum and Quadragesimo Anno, Catholic social teaching does not support unrestricted capitalism, primarily because it is considered part of liberalism and secondly by its nature, which goes against social justice. In 2013, Pope Francis said that more restrictions on the free market were required because the "dictatorship" of the global financial system and the "cult of money" were making people miserable. In his encyclical Laudato si', Pope Francis denounced the role of capitalism in furthering climate change.

Islam forbids lending money at interest (riba), the mode of operation of capitalist finance, although Islamic banks have developed alternative methods of making profits in transactions that are traditionally arranged using interest.

Socialism 

Socialists argue that the accumulation of capital generates waste through externalities that require costly corrective regulatory measures. They also point out that this process generates wasteful industries and practices that exist only to generate sufficient demand for products to be sold at a profit (such as high-pressure advertisement), thereby creating rather than satisfying economic demand.

Socialists argue that capitalism consists of irrational activity, such as the purchasing of commodities only to sell at a later time when their price appreciates (known as speculation), rather than for consumption. Therefore, a crucial criticism often made by socialists is that making money, or accumulation of capital, does not correspond to the satisfaction of demand (the production of use-values). The fundamental criterion for economic activity in capitalism is the accumulation of capital for reinvestment in production. This spurs the development of new, non-productive industries that do not produce use-value and only exist to keep the accumulation process afloat. An example of a non-productive industry is the financial industry, which contributes to the formation of economic bubbles.

Socialists view private property relations as limiting the potential of productive forces in the economy. According to socialists, private property becomes obsolete when it concentrates into centralized, socialized institutions based on private appropriation of revenue (but based on cooperative work and internal planning in allocation of inputs) until the role of the capitalist becomes redundant. With no need for capital accumulation and a class of owners, private property of the means of production is perceived as being an outdated form of economic organization that should be replaced by a free association of individuals based on public or common ownership of these socialized assets. Private ownership imposes constraints on planning, leading to uncoordinated economic decisions that result in business fluctuations, unemployment and a tremendous waste of material resources during crisis of overproduction.

Excessive disparities in income distribution lead to social instability and require costly corrective measures in the form of redistributive taxation. This incurs heavy administrative costs while weakening the incentive to work, inviting dishonesty and increasing the likelihood of tax evasion (the corrective measures) while reducing the overall efficiency of the market economy. These corrective policies limit the market's incentive system by providing things such as minimum wages, unemployment insurance, taxing profits and reducing the reserve army of labor, resulting in reduced incentives for capitalists to invest in more production. In essence, social welfare policies cripple capitalism's incentive system and are thus unsustainable in the long-run.

Marxists argue that the establishment of a socialist mode of production is the only way to overcome these deficiencies. Socialists and specifically Marxian socialists, argue that the inherent conflict of interests between the working class and capital prevent optimal use of available human resources and leads to contradictory interest groups (labor and business) striving to influence the state to intervene in the economy at the expense of overall economic efficiency.

Early socialists (utopian socialists and Ricardian socialists) criticized capitalism for concentrating power and wealth within a small segment of society who do not utilize available technology and resources to their maximum potential in the interests of the public.

Topics of criticism

Democracy and freedom 

Economist Branko Horvat stated that "[I]t is now well known that capitalist development leads to the concentration of capital, employment and power. It is somewhat less known that it leads to the almost complete destruction of economic freedom".

Critics argue that capitalism leads to a significant loss of political, democratic and economic power for the vast majority of the global human population. The reason for this is they believe capitalism creates very large concentrations of money and property in the hands of a relatively small minority of the global human population (the elite or the power elite), leading, they say, to very large and increasing wealth and income inequalities between the elite and the majority of the population. "Corporate capitalism" and "inverted totalitarianism" are terms used by the aforementioned activists and critics of capitalism to describe a capitalist marketplace—and society—characterized by the dominance of hierarchical, bureaucratic, large corporations, which are legally required to pursue profit without concern for social welfare. Corporate capitalism has been criticized for the amount of power and influence corporations and large business interest groups have over government policy, including the policies of regulatory agencies and influencing political campaigns. Many social scientists have criticized corporations for failing to act in the interests of the people; they claim the existence of large corporations seems to circumvent the principles of democracy, which assumes equal power relations between all individuals in a society. As part of the political left, activists against corporate power and influence work towards a decreased income gap and improved economical equity.

The rise of giant multinational corporations has been a topic of concern among the aforementioned scholars, intellectuals and activists, who see the large corporation as leading to deep, structural erosion of such basic human rights and civil rights as equitable wealth and income distribution, equitable democratic political and socio-economic power representation and many other human rights and needs. They have pointed out that in their view large corporations create false needs in consumers and—they contend—have had a long history of interference in and distortion of the policies of sovereign nation states through high-priced legal lobbying and other almost always legal, powerful forms of influence peddling. In their view, evidence supporting this belief includes invasive advertising (such as billboards, television ads, adware, spam, telemarketing, child-targeted advertising and guerrilla marketing), massive open or secret corporate political campaign contributions in so-called "democratic" elections, corporatocracy, the revolving door between government and corporations, regulatory capture, "too big to fail" (also known as "too big to jail"), massive taxpayer-provided corporate bailouts, socialism/communism for the very rich and brutal, vicious, Darwinian capitalism for everyone else, and—they claim—seemingly endless global news stories about corporate corruption (Martha Stewart and Enron, among other examples). Anti-corporate-activists express the view that large corporations answer only to large shareholders, giving human rights issues, social justice issues, environmental issues and other issues of high significance to the bottom 99% of the global human population virtually no consideration. American political philosopher Jodi Dean says that contemporary economic and financial calamities have dispelled the notion that capitalism is a viable economic system, adding that "the fantasy that democracy exerts a force for economic justice has dissolved as the US government funnels trillions of dollars to banks and European central banks rig national governments and cut social programs to keep themselves afloat."

David Schweickart wrote: "Ordinary people [in capitalist societies] are deemed competent enough to select their political leaders-but not their bosses. Contemporary capitalism celebrates democracy, yet denies us our democratic rights at precisely the point where they might be utilized most immediately and concretely: at the place where we spend most of the active and alert hours of our adult lives".

Thomas Jefferson, one of the founders of the United States, said "I hope we shall crush ... in its birth the aristocracy of our moneyed corporations, which dare already to challenge our government to a trial of strength and bid defiance to the laws of our country". In an 29 April 1938 message to the U. S. Congress, Franklin D. Roosevelt warned that the growth of private power could lead to fascism, arguing that "the liberty of a democracy is not safe if the people tolerate the growth of private power to a point where it becomes stronger than their democratic state itself. That, in its essence, is fascism—ownership of government by an individual, by a group, or by any other controlling private power. Statistics of the Bureau of Internal Revenue reveal the following figures for 1935: "Ownership of corporate assets: Of all corporations reporting from every part of the Nation, one-tenth of 1 percent of them owned 52 percent of the assets of all of them".

U. S. President Dwight D. Eisenhower criticized the notion of the confluence of corporate power and de facto fascism and in his 1961 Farewell Address to the Nation brought attention to the "conjunction of an immense military establishment and a large arms industry" in the United States and stressed "the need to maintain balance in and among national programs—balance between the private and the public economy, balance between cost and hoped for advantage".

In a 1986 debate on Socialism vs Capitalism with John Judis vs Harry Binswanger and John Ridpath, intellectual Christopher Hitchens said:

Exploitation of workers 

Critics of capitalism view the system as inherently exploitative. In an economic sense, exploitation is often related to the expropriation of labor for profit and based on Karl Marx's version of the labor theory of value. The labor theory of value was supported by classical economists like David Ricardo and Adam Smith who believed that "the value of a commodity depends on the relative quantity of labor which is necessary for its production".

In Das Kapital, Marx identified the commodity as the basic unit of capitalist organization. Marx described a "common denominator" between commodities, in particular that commodities are the product of labor and are related to each other by an exchange value (i.e. price). By using the labor theory of value, Marxists see a connection between labor and exchange value, in that commodities are exchanged depending on the socially necessary labor time needed to produce them. However, due to the productive forces of industrial organization, laborers are seen as creating more exchange value during the course of the working day than the cost of their survival (food, shelter, clothing and so on). Marxists argue that capitalists are thus able to pay for this cost of survival while expropriating the excess labor (i.e. surplus value).

Marxists further argue that due to economic inequality, the purchase of labor cannot occur under "free" conditions. Since capitalists control the means of production (e.g. factories, businesses, machinery and so on) and workers control only their labor, the worker is naturally coerced into allowing their labor to be exploited. Critics argue that exploitation occurs even if the exploited consents, since the definition of exploitation is independent of consent. In essence, workers must allow their labor to be exploited or face starvation. Since some degree of unemployment is typical in modern economies, Marxists argue that wages are naturally driven down in free market systems. Hence, even if a worker contests their wages, capitalists are able to find someone from the reserve army of labor who is more desperate.

The act (or threat) of striking has historically been an organized action to withhold labor from capitalists, without fear of individual retaliation. Some critics of capitalism, while acknowledging the necessity of trade unionism, believe that trade unions simply reform an already exploitative system, leaving the system of exploitation intact. Lysander Spooner argued that "almost all fortunes are made out of the capital and labour of other men than those who realize them. Indeed, large fortunes could rarely be made at all by one individual, except by his sponging capital and labour from others".

Some labor historians and scholars have argued that unfree labor—by slaves, indentured servants, prisoners, or other coerced persons—is compatible with capitalist relations. Tom Brass argued that unfree labor is acceptable to capital. Historian Greg Grandin argues that capitalism has its origins in slavery, saying that "[w]hen historians talk about the Atlantic market revolution, they are talking about capitalism. And when they are talking about capitalism, they are talking about slavery." Some historians, including Edward E. Baptist and Sven Beckert, assert that slavery was an integral component in the violent development of American and global capitalism. The Slovenian continental philosopher Slavoj Žižek posits that the new era of global capitalism has ushered in new forms of contemporary slavery, including migrant workers deprived of basic civil rights on the Arabian Peninsula, the total control of workers in Asian sweatshops and the use of forced labor in the exploitation of natural resources in Central Africa.

Academics such as the developmental psychologist Howard Gardner have proposed the adoption of upper limits in individual wealth as "a solution that would make the world a better place". Marxian economist Richard D. Wolff postulates that capitalist economies prioritize profits and capital accumulation over the social needs of communities, and that capitalist enterprises rarely include the workers in the basic decisions of the enterprise.

Political economist Clara E. Mattei of the New School for Social Research demonstrates that the imposition of fiscal, monetary and industrial austerity policies meant to discipline labor by reinforcing hierarchal wage relations and therefore protect the capitalist system through wage repression and the weakening of collective bargaining power by workers can increase their exploitation while boosting the profits of the ownership class, which she says is one of the primary drivers of the "global inequality trend". As an example, Mattei shows that over the last four decades in the United States the profit share of national output increased while labor's share plummeted, demonstrating a symmetrical relationship between owner profit and worker loss, where the former was taking from the latter. She adds that “an increase in exploitation was also evident, with real wages grossly lagging behind labor productivity.”

Imperialism, political oppression, and genocide 

Near the start of the 20th century, Vladimir Lenin wrote that state use of military power to defend capitalist interests abroad was an inevitable corollary of monopoly capitalism. He argued that capitalism needs imperialism to survive. According to Lenin, the export of financial capital superseded the export of commodities; banking and industrial capital merged to form large financial cartels and trusts in which production and distribution are highly centralized; and monopoly capitalists influenced state policy to carve up the world into spheres of interest. These trends led states to defend their capitalist interests abroad through military power.

According to economic anthropologist Jason Hickel, capitalism requires the accumulation of excess wealth in the hands of economic elites for the purpose of large scale investment, continuous growth and expansion, and enormous amounts of cheap labor. As such, there was never and could never have been a gradual or peaceful transition to capitalism, and that "organized violence, mass impoverishment, and the destruction of self-sufficient subsistence economies" ushered in the capitalist era. Its emergence was fueled by immiseration and extreme violence that accompanied enclosure and colonization, with colonized peoples becoming enslaved workers producing products that were then processed by European peasants, dispossessed by enclosure, who filled the factories in desperation as exploited cheap labor. Hickel adds that there was fierce resistance to these developments, as that the period 1500 to the 1800s, "right into the Industrial Revolution, was among the bloodiest, most tumultuous times in world history."

Sociologist David Nibert argues that while capitalism "turned out to be every bit as violent and oppressive as the social systems dominated by the old aristocrats", it also included "an additional and pernicious peril—the necessity for continuous growth and expansion". As an example of this, Nibert points to the mass killing of millions of buffalo on the Great Plains and the subjugation and expulsion of the indigenous population by the U.S. military in the 19th century for the purpose of expanding ranching operations, and rearing livestock for the purpose of profit.

Capitalism and capitalist governments have also been criticized as oligarchic in nature, due to the inevitable inequality.

The military–industrial complex, mentioned in Dwight D. Eisenhower's presidential farewell address, appears to play a significant role in the American capitalist system. It may be one of the driving forces of American militarism and intervention abroad. The United States has used military force and has encouraged and facilitated state terrorism and mass violence to entrench neoliberal capitalism in the Global South, protect the interests of U.S. economic elites, and to crush any possible resistance to this entrenchment, especially during the Cold War, with significant cases being Brazil, Chile and Indonesia.

Inefficiency, irrationality, and unpredictability 
Some opponents criticize capitalism's inefficiency. They note a shift from pre-industrial reuse and thriftiness before capitalism to a consumer-based economy that pushes "ready-made" materials. It is argued that a sanitation industry arose under capitalism that deemed trash valueless—a significant break from the past when much "waste" was used and reused almost indefinitely. In the process, critics say, capitalism has created a profit driven system based on selling as many products as possible. Critics relate the "ready-made" trend to a growing garbage problem in which, as of 2008, 4.5 pounds of trash are generated per person each day (compared to 2.7 pounds in 1960). Anti-capitalist groups with an emphasis on conservation include eco-socialists and social ecologists.

Planned obsolescence has been criticized as a wasteful practice under capitalism. By designing products to wear out faster than need be, new consumption is generated. This would benefit corporations by increasing sales while at the same time generating excessive waste. A well-known example is the charge that Apple designed its iPod to fail after 18 months. Critics view planned obsolescence as wasteful and an inefficient use of resources. Other authors such as Naomi Klein have criticized brand-based marketing for putting more emphasis on the company's name-brand than on manufacturing products.

Some economists, most notably Marxian economists, argue that the system of perpetual capital accumulation leads to irrational outcomes and a mis-allocation of resources as industries and jobs are created for the sake of making money as opposed to satisfying actual demands and needs.

Market failure 
Market failure is a term used by economists to describe the condition where the allocation of goods and services by a market is not efficient. Keynesian economist Paul Krugman views this scenario in which individuals' pursuit of self-interest leads to bad results for society as a whole. John Maynard Keynes preferred economic intervention by government to free markets. Some believe that the lack of perfect information and perfect competition in a free market is grounds for government intervention. Others perceive certain unique problems with a free market including: monopolies, monopsonies, insider trading and price gouging.

Inequality 

Critics argue that capitalism is associated with the unfair distribution of wealth and power; a tendency toward market monopoly or oligopoly (and government by oligarchy); imperialism, counter-revolutionary wars and various forms of economic and cultural exploitation; repression of workers and trade unionists and phenomena such as social alienation, economic inequality, unemployment and economic instability. Critics have argued that there is an inherent tendency toward oligopolistic structures when laissez-faire is combined with capitalist private property. Capitalism is regarded by many socialists to be irrational in that production and the direction of the economy are unplanned, creating many inconsistencies and internal contradictions and thus should be controlled through public policy.

In the early 20th century, Vladimir Lenin argued that state use of military power to defend capitalist interests abroad was an inevitable corollary of monopoly capitalism.

In a 1965 letter to Carlos Quijano, editor of Marcha, a weekly newspaper published in Montevideo, Uruguay, Che Guevara wrote:
The laws of capitalism, which are blind and are invisible to ordinary people, act upon the individual without he or she being aware of it. One sees only the vastness of a seemingly infinite horizon ahead. That is how it is painted by capitalist propagandists who purport to draw a lesson from the example of Rockefeller—whether or not it is true—about the possibilities of individual success. The amount of poverty and suffering required for a Rockefeller to emerge, and the amount of depravity entailed in the accumulation of a fortune of such magnitude, are left out of the picture, and it is not always possible for the popular forces to expose this clearly. ... It is a contest among wolves. One can win only at the cost of the failure of others.

A modern critic of capitalism is Ravi Batra, who focuses on inequality as a source of immiserization but also of system failure. Batra popularised the concept "share of wealth held by richest 1%" as an indicator of inequality and an important determinant of depressions in his best-selling books in the 1980s. The scholars Kristen Ghodsee and Mitchell A. Orenstein suggest that left to its own devices, capitalism will result in a small group of economic elites capturing the majority of wealth and power in society. Dylan Sullivan and Jason Hickel argue that poverty continues to exist in the contemporary global capitalist system in spite of it being highly productive because it is undemocratic and has maintained conditions of extreme inequality where masses of working people, who have no ownership or control over the means of production, have their labor power "appropriated by a ruling class or an external imperial power," and are cut off from common land and resources.

In the United States, the shares of earnings and wealth of the households in the top 1 percent of the corresponding distributions are 21 percent (in 2006) and 37 percent (in 2009), respectively. Critics, such as Ravi Batra, argue that the capitalist system has inherent biases favoring those who already possess greater resources. The inequality may be propagated through inheritance and economic policy. Rich people are in a position to give their children a better education and inherited wealth and that this can create or increase large differences in wealth between people who do not differ in ability or effort. One study shows that in the United States 43.35% of the people in the Forbes magazine "400 richest individuals" list were already rich enough at birth to qualify. Another study indicated that in the United States wealth, race and schooling are important to the inheritance of economic status, but that IQ is not a major contributor and the genetic transmission of IQ is even less important. Batra has argued that the tax and benefit legislation in the United States since the Reagan presidency has contributed greatly to the inequalities and economic problems and should be repealed.

Market instability 
Critics of capitalism, particularly Marxists, identify market instability as a permanent feature of capitalist economy. Marx believed that the unplanned and explosive growth of capitalism does not occur in a smooth manner, but is interrupted by periods of overproduction in which stagnation or decline occur (i.e. recessions). In the view of Marxists, several contradictions in the capitalist mode of production are present, particularly the internal contradiction between anarchy in the sphere of capital (i.e. free market) and socialised production in the sphere of labor (i.e. industrialism). In The Communist Manifesto, Marx and Engels highlighted what they saw as a uniquely capitalist juxtaposition of overabundance and poverty: "Society suddenly finds itself put back into a state of momentary barbarism. And why? Because there is too much civilization, too much means of subsistence, too much industry, too much commerce".

Some scholars blame the financial crisis of 2007–2008 on the neoliberal capitalist model. Following the banking crisis of 2007, economist and former Chair of the Federal Reserve, Alan Greenspan told the United States Congress on 23 October 2008 that "[t]his modern risk-management paradigm held sway for decades. The whole intellectual edifice, however, collapsed in the summer of last year", and that "I made a mistake in presuming that the self-interests of organizations, specifically banks and others, were such that they were best capable of protecting their own shareholders and their equity in firms ... I was shocked".

Property 
Pierre-Joseph Proudhon and Friedrich Engels argue that the free market is not necessarily free, but weighted towards those who already own private property. They view capitalist regulations, including the enforcement of private property on land and exclusive rights to natural resources, as unjustly enclosing upon what should be owned by all, forcing those without private property to sell their labor to capitalists and landlords in a market favorable to the latter, thus forcing workers to accept low wages to survive. In his criticism of capitalism, Proudhon believed that the emphasis on private property is the problem. He argued that property is theft, arguing that private property leads to despotism: "Now, property necessarily engenders despotism—the government of caprice, the reign of libidinous pleasure. That is so clearly the essence of property that, to be convinced of it, one need but remember what it is, and observe what happens around him. Property is the right to use and abuse". Many left-wing anarchists, such as anarchist communists, believe in replacing capitalist private property with a system where people can lay claim to things based on personal use and claim that "[private] property is the domination of an individual, or a coalition of individuals, over things; it is not the claim of any person or persons to the use of things" and "this is, usufruct, a very different matter. Property means the monopoly of wealth, the right to prevent others using it, whether the owner needs it or not".

Mutualists and some anarchists support markets and private property, but not in their present form. They argue that particular aspects of modern capitalism violate the ability of individuals to trade in the absence of coercion. Mutualists support markets and private property in the product of labor, but only when these markets guarantee that workers will realize for themselves the value of their labor.

In recent times, most economies have extended private property rights to include such things as patents and copyrights. Critics see these so-called intellectual property laws as coercive against those with few prior resources. They argue that such regulations discourage the sharing of ideas and encourage nonproductive rent seeking behavior, both of which enact a deadweight loss on the economy, erecting a prohibitive barrier to entry into the market. Not all pro-capitalists support the concept of copyrights, but those who do argue that compensation to the creator is necessary as an incentive.

Environmental sustainability 

Many aspects of capitalism have come under attack from the anti-globalization movement, which is primarily opposed to corporate capitalism. Environmentalists and scholars have argued that capitalism requires continual economic growth and that it will inevitably deplete the finite natural resources of Earth and cause mass extinctions of animal and plant life. Such critics argue that while neoliberalism, the ideological backbone of contemporary globalized capitalism, has indeed increased global trade, it has also destroyed traditional ways of life, exacerbated inequality, increased global poverty, and that environmental indicators indicate massive environmental degradation since the late 1970s.

Some scholars argue that the capitalist approach to environmental economics does not take into consideration the preservation of natural resources and that capitalism creates three ecological problems: growth, technology, and consumption. The growth problem results from the nature of capitalism, as it focuses around the accumulation of capital. The innovation of new technologies has an impact on the environmental future as they serve as a capitalist tool in which environmental technologies can result in the expansion of the system. Consumption is focused around the capital accumulation of commodities and neglects the use-value of production.

One of the main modern criticism to the sustainability of capitalism is related to the so-called commodity chains, or production/consumption chains. These terms refer to the network of transfers of materials and commodities that is currently part of the functioning of the global capitalist system. Examples include high tech commodities produced in countries with low average wages by multinational firms and then being sold in distant high income countries; materials and resources being extracted in some countries, turned into finished products in some others and sold as commodities in further ones; and countries exchanging with each other the same kind of commodities for the sake of consumers' choice (e.g. Europe both exporting and importing cars to and from the United States). According to critics, such processes, all of which produce pollution and waste of resources, are an integral part of the functioning of capitalism (i.e. its "metabolism").

Critics note that the statistical methods used in calculating ecological footprint have been criticized and some find the whole concept of counting how much land is used to be flawed, arguing that there is nothing intrinsically negative about using more land to improve living standards (rejection of the intrinsic value of nature).

Many environmentalists have long argued that the real dangers are due to the world's current social institutions that claim to promote environmentally irresponsible consumption and production. Under what they call the "grow or die" imperative of capitalism, they say there is little reason to expect hazardous consumption and production practices to change in a timely manner. They also claim that markets and states invariably drag their feet on substantive environmental reform and are notoriously slow to adopt viable sustainable technologies. Immanuel Wallerstein, referring to the externalization of costs as the "dirty secret" of capitalism, claims that there are built-in limits to ecological reform and that the costs of doing business in the world capitalist economy are ratcheting upward because of deruralization and democratization.

A team of Finnish scientists hired by the UN Secretary-General to aid the 2019 Global Sustainable Development Report assert that capitalism as we know it is moribund, primarily because it focuses on short term profits and fails to look after the long term needs of people and the environment which is being subjected to unsustainable exploitation. Their report goes on to link many seemingly disparate contemporary crises to this system, including environmental factors such as global warming and accelerated species extinctions and also societal factors such as rising economic inequality, unemployment, sluggish economic growth, rising debt levels, and impuissant governments unable to deal with these problems. The scientists say a new economic model, one which focuses on sustainability and efficiency and not profit and growth, will be needed as decades of robust economic growth driven by abundant resources and cheap energy is rapidly coming to a close. Another group of scientists contributing to the 2020 "Scientists warning on affluence" argue that a shift away from paradigms fixating on economic growth and the "profit-driven mechanism of prevailing economic systems" will be necessary to mitigate human impacts on the environment, and suggest a range of ideas from the reformist to the radical, with the latter consisting of degrowth, eco-socialism and eco-anarchism.

Some scientists contend that the rise of capitalism, which itself developed out of European imperialism and colonialism of the 15th and 16th centuries, marks the emergence of the Anthropocene epoch, in which human beings started to have significant and mostly negative impacts on the earth system. Others have warned that contemporary global capitalism "requires fundamental changes" to mitigate the worst environmental impacts, including the "abolition of perpetual economic growth, properly pricing externalities, a rapid exit from fossil-fuel use, strict regulation of markets and property acquisition, reining in corporate lobbying, and the empowerment of women". Jason Hickel writes that capitalism creates pressures for population growth: "more people means more labour, cheaper labour, and more consumers." He argues that continued population growth makes the challenge of sustainability even more difficult, but adds that even if the population leveled off, capitalism will simply get already existing consumers to increase their consumption, as consumption rates have always outpaced population growth rates.

Profit motive 
The majority of criticisms against the profit motive centre on the idea that the profit motive encourages selfishness and greed, rather than serving the public good or necessarily creating an increase in net wealth. Critics of the profit motive contend that companies disregard morals or public safety in the pursuit of profits.

Free market economists counter that the profit motive, coupled with competition, actually reduces the final price of an item for consumption, rather than raising it. They argue that businesses profit by selling a good at a lower price and at a greater volume than the competition. Economist Thomas Sowell uses supermarkets as an example to illustrate this point:

American economist Milton Friedman has argued that greed and self-interest are universal human traits. In a 1979 episode of The Phil Donahue Show, Friedman stated: "The world runs on individuals pursuing their separate interests". He continued by explaining that only in capitalist countries, where individuals can pursue their own self-interest, people have been able to escape from "grinding poverty".

Comparison to slavery 

Wage labor has long been compared to slavery. As a result, the phrase "wage slavery" is often utilized as a pejorative for wage labor. Similarly, advocates of slavery looked upon the "comparative evils of Slave Society and of Free Society, of slavery to human Masters and slavery to Capital" and proceeded to argue that wage slavery was actually worse than chattel slavery. Slavery apologists like George Fitzhugh contended that workers only accepted wage labor with the passage of time as they became "familiarised and inattentive to the infected social atmosphere they continually inhale". Scholars have debated the exact relationship between wage labor, slavery, and capitalism at length, especially for the Antebellum South.

With the advent of the Industrial Revolution, thinkers such as Pierre-Joseph Proudhon and Karl Marx elaborated the comparison between wage labor and slavery in the context of a critique of societal property not intended for active personal use while Luddites emphasized the dehumanisation brought about by machines. Before the American Civil War, Southern defenders of African American slavery invoked the concept of wage slavery to favorably compare the condition of their slaves to workers in the North. The United States abolished slavery during the Civil War, but labor union activists found the metaphor useful. According to Lawrence Glickman, in the Gilded Age "references abounded in the labor press, and it is hard to find a speech by a labour leader without the phrase".

According to Noam Chomsky, analysis of the psychological implications of wage slavery goes back to the Enlightenment era. In his 1791 book On the Limits of State Action, liberal thinker Wilhelm von Humboldt explained how "whatever does not spring from a man's free choice, or is only the result of instruction and guidance, does not enter into his very nature; he does not perform it with truly human energies, but merely with mechanical exactness" and so when the laborer works under external control, "we may admire what he does, but we despise what he is". Both the Milgram and Stanford experiments have been found useful in the psychological study of wage-based workplace relations. 

Additionally, as per anthropologist David Graeber, the earliest wage labor contracts known about were in fact contracts for the rental of chattel slaves (usually the owner would receive a share of the money and the slave another, with which to maintain his or her living expenses). According to Graeber, such arrangements were quite common in New World slavery as well, whether in the United States or Brazil. C. L. R. James argued in The Black Jacobins that most of the techniques of human organisation employed on factory workers during the Industrial Revolution were first developed on slave plantations.

Some anti-capitalist thinkers claim that the elite maintain wage slavery and a divided working class through their influence over the media and entertainment industry, educational institutions, unjust laws, nationalist and corporate propaganda, pressures and incentives to internalize values serviceable to the power structure, state violence, fear of unemployment and a historical legacy of exploitation and profit accumulation/transfer under prior systems, which shaped the development of economic theory.

Adam Smith noted that employers often conspire together to keep wages low:

Aristotle made the statement that "the citizens must not live a mechanic or a mercantile life (for such a life is ignoble and inimical to virtue), nor yet must those who are to be citizens in the best state be tillers of the soil (for leisure is needed both for the development of virtue and for active participation in politics)", often paraphrased as "all paid jobs absorb and degrade the mind". Cicero wrote in 44 BC that "vulgar are the means of livelihood of all hired workmen whom we pay for mere manual labour, not for artistic skill; for in their case the very wage they receive is a pledge of their slavery". Somewhat similar criticisms have also been expressed by some proponents of liberalism, like Henry George, Silvio Gesell and Thomas Paine as well as the Distributist school of thought within the Roman Catholic Church.

To Marxist and anarchist thinkers like Mikhail Bakunin and Peter Kropotkin, wage slavery was a class condition in place due to the existence of private property and the state. This class situation rested primarily on:
 The existence of property not intended for active use.
 The concentration of ownership in few hands.
 The lack of direct access by workers to the means of production and consumption goods.
 The perpetuation of a reserve army of unemployed workers.

For Marxists, labor as commodity, which is how they regard wage labor, provides a fundamental point of attack against capitalism. "It can be persuasively argued", noted one concerned philosopher, "that the conception of the worker's labour as a commodity confirms Marx's stigmatization of the wage system of private capitalism as 'wage-slavery;' that is, as an instrument of the capitalist's for reducing the worker's condition to that of a slave, if not below it". That this objection is fundamental follows immediately from Marx's conclusion that wage labor is the very foundation of capitalism: "Without a class dependent on wages, the moment individuals confront each other as free persons, there can be no production of surplus value; without the production of surplus-value there can be no capitalist production, and hence no capital and no capitalist!".

Supply and demand 

At least two assumptions are necessary for the validity of the standard model: first, that supply and demand are independent; and second, that supply is "constrained by a fixed resource". If these conditions do not hold, then the Marshallian model cannot be sustained. Sraffa's critique focused on the inconsistency (except in implausible circumstances) of partial equilibrium analysis and the rationale for the upward slope of the supply curve in a market for a produced consumption good. The notability of Sraffa's critique is also demonstrated by Paul A. Samuelson's comments and engagements with it over many years, stating:
What a cleaned-up version of Sraffa (1926) establishes is how nearly empty are all of Marshall's partial equilibrium boxes. To a logical purist of Wittgenstein and Sraffa class, the Marshallian partial equilibrium box of constant cost is even more empty than the box of increasing cost.

Aggregate excess demand in a market is the difference between the quantity demanded and the quantity supplied as a function of price. In the model with an upward-sloping supply curve and downward-sloping demand curve, the aggregate excess demand function only intersects the axis at one point, namely at the point where the supply and demand curves intersect. The Sonnenschein–Mantel–Debreu theorem shows that the standard model cannot be rigorously derived in general from general equilibrium theory.

The model of prices being determined by supply and demand assumes perfect competition. However, "economists have no adequate model of how individuals and firms adjust prices in a competitive model. If all participants are price-takers by definition, then the actor who adjusts prices to eliminate excess demand is not specified". Goodwin, Nelson, Ackerman and Weisskopf write:
If we mistakenly confuse precision with accuracy, then we might be misled into thinking that an explanation expressed in precise mathematical or graphical terms is somehow more rigorous or useful than one that takes into account particulars of history, institutions or business strategy. This is not the case. Therefore, it is important not to put too much confidence in the apparent precision of supply and demand graphs. Supply and demand analysis is a useful precisely formulated conceptual tool that clever people have devised to help us gain an abstract understanding of a complex world. It does not—nor should it be expected to—give us in addition an accurate and complete description of any particular real world market.

Surveillance 

According to Harvard academic Shoshana Zuboff, a new genus of capitalism, surveillance capitalism monetizes data acquired through surveillance. She states that it was first discovered and consolidated at Google, emerged due to the "coupling of the vast powers of the digital with the radical indifference and intrinsic narcissism of the financial capitalism and its neoliberal vision that have dominated commerce for at least three decades, especially in the Anglo economies" and depends on the global architecture of computer mediation which produces a distributed and largely uncontested new expression of power she calls "Big Other".

Racism 
According to Immanuel Wallerstein, institutional racism has been "one of the most significant pillars" of the capitalist system and serves as "the ideological justification for the hierarchization of the work-force and its highly unequal distributions of reward".

Counter-criticism

Austrian School 
Austrian School economists have argued that capitalism can organize itself into a complex system without an external guidance or central planning mechanism. Friedrich Hayek considered the phenomenon of self-organisation as underpinning capitalism. Prices serve as a signal as to the urgent and unfulfilled wants of people and the opportunity to earn profits if successful, or absorb losses if resources are used poorly or left idle, gives entrepreneurs incentive to use their knowledge and resources to satisfy those wants. Thus the activities of millions of people, each seeking their own interest, are coordinated.

Ayn Rand 
The novelist Ayn Rand made positive moral defenses of laissez-faire capitalism, most notably in her 1957 novel Atlas Shrugged and in her 1966 collection of essays Capitalism: The Unknown Ideal. She argued that capitalism should be supported on moral grounds, not just on the basis of practical benefits. Her ideas have had significant influence over conservative and libertarian supporters of capitalism, especially within the American Tea Party movement. 

Rand defined capitalism as "a social system based on the recognition of individual rights, including property rights, in which all property is privately owned". According to Rand, the role of government in a capitalist state has three broad categories of proper functions: first, the police "to protect men from criminals"; second, the armed services "to protect men from foreign invaders"; and third, the law courts "to settle disputes among men according to objective laws".

See also 

 Almighty dollar
 Anarchism and capitalism
 Anti-globalisation
 Capital in the Twenty-First Century
 Crisis theory
 Criticism of communist party rule
 Criticism of libertarianism
 Criticisms of corporations
 Criticism of Marxism
 Criticism of socialism
 Culture of capitalism
 Economic calculation problem
 Late capitalism
 Market fundamentalism
 Post-capitalism
 Social criticism
 Socialism for the rich and capitalism for the poor
 
 The Theory of the Leisure Class
 This Changes Everything: Capitalism vs. the Climate
 Why Socialism?

References

Works cited

Further reading

External links 

 A Reconsideration of the Theory of Entrepreneurship: a participatory approach – critique of capitalism
 How The Miners Were Robbed – 1907 anti-capitalist pamphlet by John Wheatley
 Information and Economics: A Critique of Hayek  by Allin F. Cottrell and W. Paul Cockshott
 Value, Price and Profit – Karl Marx on the basic features of capitalism
 Crisis of Capitalism by David Harvey. Royal Society of Arts. 28 June 2010.
 Richard Wolff on Curing Capitalism. Moyers & Company. 22 March 2013.
 Occupy was right: capitalism has failed the world. Andrew Hussey. The Guardian. 12 April 2014 (interview with Thomas Piketty).
 Unless It Changes, Capitalism Will Starve Humanity By 2050. Forbes. 9 February 2016.
 New Zealand's new prime minister calls capitalism a 'blatant failure'. The Independent. 22 October 2017.
 Capitalism in crisis: U.S. billionaires worry about the survival of the system that made them rich. The Washington Post. 20 April 2019
 Broken Capitalism series in The Guardian.
 The Influence of Environmental Toxicity, Inequity and Capitalism on Reproductive Health. Center for Biological Diversity. 2022.

 
Issues in anarchism
Marxian economics
Social philosophy
Socialism